Monte Cornaccione, or simply Cornaccione, is a mountain in the Marche, Province of Macerata, in the Monti Sibillini National Park.  Its peak rises 1769 meters above mean sea level.

Name
The place is named Cornaccione because it can seem to a horn (in Italian: corno).

Near Villages
At the foot of Monte Cornaccione there is Macchie.

Connections
Cornaccione is connected to Monte Bicco and Monte Bove Sud.

Cornaccione, Monte